The table below lists domestic professional sports leagues from around the world by total attendances for the last completed season for which data is available. The following points should be considered:
 In some cases the figures listed are for main season games only.
 In some sports (mainly North American centered sports leagues) the main league competition provides each club or franchise with virtually the whole of its attendance and revenue. In others, there are multiple competitions, for example leading English football clubs compete in four competitions each season, but only the league competition is listed below.
 In some sports, for example cricket and rugby union, international competitions and transnational club competitions provide a significant part of total attendances and revenue.
 Free or heavily discounted seats may be counted by some leagues. No-shows for paid seats may be included in some cases, but not in others.
 Not all leagues publish official attendance figures. Various media outlets produce their own figures and sometimes these do not agree, but the differences in the averages given are usually no more than one or two percent.
 In some cases the official attendance figure released by clubs and/or their league may reflect the ticket sell through rather than the number of people in attendance on the night, this can result in a discrepancy of many thousands of attendees per event.
 The "leagues" below include pure league competitions, where the team that finishes at the top of the table is declared the winner, such as the Premier League, and hybrid league/knock-out competitions, where the best league performers enter a knock-out phase (also called a playoff) to decide the winner, such as the National Football League.
 In some sports (mainly North American and Australian centered sports), leagues use a franchise-based system (without promotion and relegation) where teams are placed (or moved to areas) where the market is best. The number of teams is usually decided by the market as well.

Top men's leagues in total attendance with a minimum of 8 million

* Seating room only

Top women's leagues in total attendance

The leagues are segregated between those which normally would play in an outdoor stadium as opposed to those leagues that use indoor arenas. Some outdoor league stadiums are equipped with either retractable or non-retractable roofs where weather conditions (such as rain or extreme heat/cold) would not allow a game to be played or watched effectively, comfortably or safely without such cover. The tables are sorted by average attendance, with a minimum of 2,000.

Outdoor sports

Indoor sports

Notes
  Until 2005, the attendance figures in NPB were estimated by the home teams. The estimated figures were normally much higher than the actual numbers of spectators in the game. The total and average attendances only covered regular season games.
  When the rugby union governing body of England, the Rugby Football Union, reorganised the country's leagues after the 2008–09 season, it reduced the second tier, previously known as National Division One but now the RFU Championship, from 16 teams to 12.
  The reorganisation of English rugby union also affected lower levels of the league pyramid. National Division Two was renamed National League 1 and increased from 14 teams to 16.
  The total attendance is for games held on Metro Manila only in which almost all gamedates are doubleheaders, and ticket holders pay for both games.
  Since the cited season, the Euroleague has expanded from 24 teams to 30.
  AAA, AA. A, and R denote a level in minor league baseball, with AAA a higher tier than AA, then A and then R (Rookie) level. Independent leagues (those not affiliated with major league teams) play in small markets at the A level or below. AAA teams play in bigger cities than AA or A clubs which would markedly increase their attendance base. For more information see Minor League Baseball.

See also
 List of sports attendance figures
 List of professional sports leagues by revenue

References

External links
 Global Attendances at sporting intelligence.com
 Most watched sports leagues – Sydney Morning Herald

Sports attendance